Vasant C. Velingkar was an Indian politician, freedom fighter and goldsmith from Goa. He was a former member of the Goa Legislative Assembly, representing the Marcaim Assembly constituency from 1963 to March 1964. He was a member of the Maharashtrawadi Gomantak Party.

Career
Velingkar contested in the 1963 Goa, Daman and Diu Legislative Assembly election from the Marcaim Assembly constituency on the Maharashtrawadi Gomantak Party (MGP) ticket and emerged victorious by defeating Indian National Congress candidate by 5,800 votes. He served for about three months and later resigned his office on 31 March 1964 for Dayanand Bandodkar. Following this a by-election was held within the constituency which resulted in Bandodkar taking charge of the Marcaim constituency, enabling him to later run for the chief ministerial seat in Goa.

Velingkar then unsuccessfully contested in the 1977 Goa, Daman and Diu Legislative Assembly election from the same constituency on the Janata Party ticket, he lost to MGP candidate Krishna Bandodkar by a margin of 4,606 votes. He along with his associates were also active in the Goa liberation movement.

Notes

References

Goa, Daman and Diu MLAs 1963–1967
Year of birth uncertain
Year of death uncertain
Goan people
People from North Goa district
Maharashtrawadi Gomantak Party politicians